Newark and Sherwood is a local government district and is the largest district in Nottinghamshire, England. The district was formed on 1 April 1974, by a merger of the municipal borough of Newark with Newark Rural District and Southwell Rural District.

The district is predominantly rural, with some large forestry plantations, the ancient Sherwood Forest and the towns of Newark-on-Trent, Southwell and Ollerton. The council is based at Castle House, adjacent to Newark Castle Railway station, having previously used Kelham Hall in the nearby village of Kelham as its headquarters.

Settlements
Newark-on-Trent, together with Balderton, forms the largest urban area in the district. Newark-on-Trent has many important historic features including Newark Castle, St Mary's Magdalene Church, Georgian architecture and a defensive earthwork from the British Civil Wars. Other important towns in the district include Ollerton and Southwell which is home to Southwell Minster and Southwell Racecourse. The village of Edwinstowe is claimed to be the birthplace of Robin Hood where he was born and was married at Church of St Mary. The south-eastern settlements are home to people who commute to Nottingham, Mansfield, Derby and Leicester. The north-eastern settlements are home to people who commute to Lincoln, Sleaford and Grantham. The north-western settlements are home to people who commute to Worksop, Retford, Gainsborough, Scunthorpe, Chesterfield, Sheffield, Rotherham and Doncaster.

Other settlements in the district include:

Averham
Balderton, Bathley, Bilsthorpe, Blidworth, Boughton, Brough
Carlton-on-Trent, Caunton, Clipstone, Collingham, Cromwell
Eakring, Edingley, Edwinstowe, Egmanton
Farndon, Farnsfield, Fernwood, Fiskerton
Gunthorpe
Halam, Halloughton, Hawton, Hockerton
Kelham, Kirklington, Kirton, Kneesall
Laxton, Little Carlton, Lowdham
Maplebeck, Morton
North Muskham, Norwell
Ossington, Oxton
Perlethorpe
Rainworth, Rolleston
South Muskham, Sutton-on-Trent
Thurgarton
Upton
Walesby, Wellow, Weston, Winkburn

Politics

Council 

The district council has been controlled by the Conservatives since 2007, with David Lloyd being leader of the council since 2018. The last election in 2019 Newark and Sherwood District Council election saw the Conservatives win 27 of the 39 seats on the council, Labour 7 seats, independents 3 seats, and Liberal Democrats 2 seats. The next elections are due in 2023.

Parliamentary constituencies 
The district is divided into two parliamentary constituencies: Newark, created in 1885, which has been represented by Robert Jenrick, a Conservative, since 2014; and has been held by the Conservative Party since 2001; and Sherwood, created in 1983, represented by Mark Spencer, also a Conservative, since 2010.

References

 
Non-metropolitan districts of Nottinghamshire